Mycobacterium interjectum is a species of the phylum Actinomycetota (Gram-positive bacteria with high guanine and cytosine content, one of the dominant phyla of all bacteria), belonging to the genus Mycobacterium.

Name
Etymology: Phylogenetic position between  rapidly and slowly growing mycobacteria.

Description
Mycobacterium interjectum is Gram-positive, nonmotile and acid-fast rods (0.6-1.0 µm x 0.7-2.0 µm). Filaments (up to 6.0 µm) possible.

Colony characteristics
Dysgonic, smooth and scotochromogenic colonies (1–2 mm in diameter).

Physiology
Slow growth on Löwenstein-Jensen medium at temperatures between 31°C and 37 °C within 3–4 weeks.
Susceptible to rifampicin.
Resistant to isoniazid and ethambutol.
Differential characteristics
Most closely related to M. simiae.
Phylogenetic position between rapidly and slowly growing mycobacteria.

Pathogenesis
Chronic lymphadenitis
Biosafety level 2

Type strain
First isolated from a lymph node of a child with chronic lymphadenitis in Germany.
Strain 4185/92 = ATCC 51457 = CCUG 37514 = DSM 44064

References

Springer et al. 1993. Mycobacterium interjectum, a new species isolated from a patient with chronic lymphadenitis. J. Clin. Microbiol., 31, 3083–3089.

External links
Type strain of Mycobacterium interjectum at BacDive -  the Bacterial Diversity Metadatabase

Acid-fast bacilli
interjectum
Bacteria described in 1995